Marly is a commune in the Moselle department in Grand Est in north-eastern France.

It has a population of 10,108 inhabitants (2019) and is situated near the city of Metz, capital of the Moselle department.

Population

See also
 Communes of the Moselle department

References

External links
 

Communes of Moselle (department)